The 2015–16 season is the 101st season of the Isthmian League, which is an English football competition featuring semi-professional and amateur clubs from London, East and South East England. Also, it is the tenth season for the current incarnations of the Division One North and Division One South.

The league constitution was announced on 15 May 2015.

After the constitution was announced, Clevedon Town of Southern League Division One South & West were demoted because their floodlights were not to the required standard. As a result, Ware were transferred to Southern League Division One Central from Isthmian League Division One North, and Redbridge were reprieved from relegation.

Premier Division

The Premier Division consisted of 24 clubs: 18 clubs from the previous season, and six new clubs:
Brentwood Town, promoted as play-off winners in Division One North
Burgess Hill Town, promoted as champions of Division One South
Farnborough, relegated from the Conference South
Merstham, promoted as play-off winners in Division One South
Needham Market, promoted as champions of Division One North
Staines Town, relegated from the Conference South

Farnborough were required by the Isthmian League to pay their creditors in full before the league's 2016 AGM. If this wasn't fulfilled, the league were to relegate the club. Therefore, if Farnborough finished top, they were not to be promoted. If they finished in a play-off place, they were not to be eligible to take part in the play-off competition. If they finished between 6th and 20th, they were to be relegated to Step 4. If they finished between 21st and 24th, they were to be relegated two steps, to Step 5.

Hampton & Richmond Borough won the division and returned to the National League South after four seasons in the Isthmian League. They were joined by play-off winners East Thurrock United, who reached National League for the first time in their history. Farnborough finally finished 18th and were relegated one step, as the result, Burgess Hill Town were reprieved. Brentwood Town relegated straight back to Division One along with Lewes and VCD Athletic.

League table

Top scorers

Play-offs

Semifinals

Final

Results

Stadia and locations

Division One North

Division One North consisted of 24 clubs: 19 clubs from the previous season, and five new clubs:
AFC Hornchurch, relegated from the Premier Division
Bury Town, relegated from the Premier Division
Haringey Borough, promoted as champions of the Essex Senior League
Phoenix Sports, promoted as champions of the Southern Counties East League
Witham Town, relegated from the Premier Division

AFC Sudbury won the division and were promoted to the Premier Division for the first time in their history. Harlow Town won the play-offs and returned to the Premier Division after seven seasons of absence. Barkingside and Redbridge, both reprieved in the previous season, finished bottom of the table and were relegated, while Wroxham were reprieved from relegation as the best eighth level club finished in the relegation zone due to lack of promoting ninth level clubs.

League table

Top scorers

Play-offs

Semifinals

Final

Results

Stadia and locations

Division One South

Division One South consisted of 24 clubs: 20 clubs from the previous season, and four new clubs:
Chatham Town, transferred from Division One North
Dorking Wanderers, promoted from the Sussex County League
Molesey, promoted as champions of the Combined Counties League
Peacehaven & Telscombe, relegated from the Premier Division

Folkestone Invicta won the division and returned to the Premier Division after four consecutive play-off defeats. Worthing won the play-offs and joined them after nine seasons in Division One South. Peacehaven & Telscombe suffered second consecutive relegation and left the league along with Whitstable Town and Walton & Hersham. Both clubs also spent nine seasons in the division.

League table

Top scorers

Play-offs

Semifinals

Final

Results

Stadia and locations

League Cup

The 2015–16 Alan Turvey Trophy sponsored by Robert Dyas (formerly the Isthmian League Cup) is the 42nd season of the Alan Turvey Trophy, the cup competition of the whole Isthmian League.

Calendar

The Isthmian League Cup was voluntary this season, five clubs decided not to take part in the competition:
Bognor Regis Town
Cray Wanderers
Dereham Town
Guernsey
Wroxham

Premilinary round
Six clubs participated in the Premilinary round, while all other clubs received a bye to the first round.

First round
The three clubs to have made it through the Premilinary round were entered into the draw with every other Isthmian League club, making sixty-four teams.

Second round

Third round

Quarterfinals

Semifinals

Final

See also
Isthmian League
2015–16 Northern Premier League
2015–16 Southern Football League

References

External links
Official website

2015-16
7